Mycoplasma agalactiae  is a species of bacteria in the genus Mycoplasma. This genus of bacteria lacks a cell wall around their cell membrane. Without a cell wall, they are unaffected by many common antibiotics such as penicillin or other beta-lactam antibiotics that target cell wall synthesis. Mycoplasma are the smallest bacterial cells yet discovered, can survive without oxygen and are typically about 0.1  µm in diameter.

It can be present in the milk of sheep and goats and can cause mastitis in the animal. At least eleven strains of this species have been characterized. In serious outbreaks with infections with this pathogen, whole herds have been lost.

The type strain is strain PG2 = CIP 59.7 = NCTC 10123.

See also
 Veterinary pathology
 Mastitis

References

External links
 Type strain of Mycoplasma agalactiae at BacDive -  the Bacterial Diversity Metadatabase

Bacteria described in 1955
Animal bacterial diseases
Pathogenic bacteria
Sheep and goat diseases
agalactiae